The 2012 ICC World Cricket League Division Five was a cricket tournament that took place from 18 to 25 February 2012. It formed part of the ICC World Cricket League and qualifying for the 2015 Cricket World Cup.  The host country for this tournament was Singapore.

Teams
The teams that took part in the tournament were decided according to the results of the 2010 ICC World Cricket League Division Five, the 2010 ICC World Cricket League Division Four, and the 2011 ICC World Cricket League Division Six.

Squads

Group stage

Points table

Fixtures

Play-offs

5th place playoff

3rd place playoff

Final

Statistics

Most runs
The top five highest run scorers (total runs) are included in this table.
The top five highest run scorers (total runs) are included in this table.

Most wickets
The following table contains the five leading wicket-takers.

Final Placings

References

2012, 5
2012 in cricket
2012 in Singaporean sport
International cricket competitions in Singapore